Robert Lewis Letsinger (July 31, 1921 – May 26, 2014) was an American biochemist and was a professor of chemistry at Northwestern University. He was best known for his research and development of chemical synthesis of DNA.

Life
Letsinger earned his B.S. in 1943 his Ph.D. in 1945, both at the Massachusetts Institute of Technology in Cambridge, Massachusetts. In 1946, he joined the department of chemistry at Northwestern University. He retired from teaching in 1991 as the emeritus Clare Hamilton Hall Professor.

Work
In the 1960s, Letsinger developed methods for solid phase synthesis of oligonucleotides, including the phosphoric triester method and the phosphoramidite synthesis. He thus laid the foundations for efficient automated synthesis of gene fragments and thus the rapid development of molecular biology.

Letsingers later dealt with nanotechnology and its application in DNA diagnostics. In 2000, Letsinger was one of the founders of the biotechnology company Nanosphere Inc.

Awards
1956 Guggenheim Fellow
1985 Rosenstiel Award
1986 Member of the National Academy of Sciences
1988 Fellow of the American Academy of Arts and Sciences
1993 Arthur C. Cope Scholar Award of the American Chemical Society

Personal life
Letsinger was married to Dorothy Thompson (1922-2010) in 1943. The couple had three children.

References

1921 births
2014 deaths
American biochemists
Fellows of the American Academy of Arts and Sciences
People from Bloomfield, Indiana
Members of the United States National Academy of Sciences
Northwestern University faculty
Massachusetts Institute of Technology alumni